The Hungarian National Road Race Championships are organized annually by the Hungarian Cycling Federation to decide the champions in the road race discipline, across various categories.

Multiple winners

Men

Women

Men

Women

See also
Hungarian National Time Trial Championships

References

National road cycling championships
Cycle races in Hungary
Road
1996 establishments in Hungary
Recurring sporting events established in 1996